Arnold Forster, or Arnold-Forster, may refer to:

 Arnold Förster (1810–1884), German entomologist
 Arnold Forster (ADL) (1912–2010), Anti-Defamation League attorney
 William Arnold-Forster (1886–1951), English politician, artist, author, and gardener
 Mark Arnold-Forster (1920–1981), English journalist and author